The Municipal Auditorium was a 3,916-seat multi-purpose arena located in Columbus, Georgia. It was opened in 1955 and closed in 1996, when the Columbus Civic Center opened. It hosted local sporting events and concerts. Notable events included performances by Count Basie in 1942, Buddy Holly, and a speech by President Ronald Reagan.

References

Defunct sports venues in Georgia (U.S. state)
Indoor arenas in Georgia (U.S. state)
Buildings and structures in Columbus, Georgia
Sports venues in Columbus, Georgia
Defunct indoor arenas in the United States
Sports venues completed in 1955
1955 establishments in Georgia (U.S. state)
1996 disestablishments in Georgia (U.S. state)